Myrcianthes is a genus of flowering plants in the myrtle family, Myrtaceae described as a genus in 1856. They are native to Central and South America, the West Indies, and southern Florida.

Taxonomy
Accepted species:

References

External links

 
Myrtaceae genera
Taxonomy articles created by Polbot
Neotropical realm flora